The Ukrainian Interlingua Society (Societate Ukrainian pro Interlingua, SUI), works in Ukraine to promote the knowledge and active use of Interlingua, an artificial language. It supports the work of the Russian representative of the Union Mundial pro Interlingua.

The society was founded in 1994 by Jurij Cherednikov, a Specialist in Computational Engineering; Victor Sitnichenko, Vice Director of the Institute of Scientific Research of Tools; and Victor Chebotar, docent of French Philology at the University of Odessa. Cherednikov was the first President; today, Sitnichenko is the society's Acting President.

External links
Biographias: Jurij Cherednikov, Historia de Interlingua, 2001, revised 2006.
Portrait del Organisationes de Interlingua, Historia de Interlingua, 2001, revised 2006.

Interlingua organizations